The convolutional sparse coding paradigm is an extension of the global sparse coding model, in which a redundant dictionary is modeled as a concatenation of circulant matrices.

The local sparsity constraint allows stronger uniqueness and stability conditions than the global sparsity prior, and has shown to be a versatile tool for inverse problems in fields such as image understanding and computer vision. Also, a recently proposed multi-layer extension of the model has shown conceptual benefits for more complex signal decompositions, as well as a tight connection the convolutional neural networks model, allowing a deeper understanding of how the latter operates.

Overview 
The global sparsity constraint prior has been shown to be useful in many ill-posed inverse problems such as image inpainting, super-resolution, and coding. It has been of particular interest for image understanding and computer vision tasks involving natural images, allowing redundant dictionaries to be efficiently inferred 

As an extension to the global sparsity constraint, recent pieces in the literature have revisited the model to reach a more profound understanding of its uniqueness and stability conditions. This model extension is denominated convolutional sparse coding (CSC) and drastically reduces the burden of estimating signal representations while being characterized by stronger uniqueness and stability conditions.

Besides its versatility in inverse problems, recent efforts have focused on the multi-layer version of the model and provided evidence of its reliability for recovering multiple underlying representations. Moreover, a tight connection between such a model and the well-established convolutional neural network model (CNN) was revealed, providing a new tool for a more rigurous understanding of its theoretical conditions.

The convolutional sparse coding model provides a very efficient set of tools to solve a wide range of inverse problems, including image denoising, image inpainting, and image superresolution. By imposing local sparsity constraints, it allows to efficiently tackle the global coding problem by iteratively estimating disjoint patches and assembling them into a global signal. Furthermore, by adopting a multi-layer sparse model, which results from imposing the sparsity constraint to the signal inherent representations themselves, the resulting "layered" pursuit algorithm keeps the strong uniqueness and stability conditions from the single-layer model. This extension also provides some interesting notions about the relation between its sparsity prior and the forward pass of the convolutional neural network, which allows to understand how the theoretical benefits of the CSC model can provide a strong mathematical meaning of the CNN structure.

Sparse coding paradigm 
Basic concepts and models are presented to explain into detail the convolutional sparse representation framework. On the grounds that the sparsity constraint has been proposed under different models, a short description of them is presented to show its evolution up to the model of interest. Also included are the concepts of mutual coherence and restricted isometry property to establish uniqueness stability guarantees.

Global sparse coding model 
Allow signal  to be expressed as a linear combination of a small number of atoms from a given dictionary . Subsequently, given , the task of recovering  from either the noise-free signal itself or an observation is denominated sparse coding. Considering the noise-free scenario, the coding problem is formulated as follows:  The effect of the  norm is to favor solutions with as much zero elements as possible. Furthermore, given an observation affected by bounded energy noise: , the pursuit problem is reformulated as:

Stability and uniqueness guarantees for the global sparse model 
Let the spark of  be defined as the minimum number of linearly independent columns: 

Then, from the triangular inequality, the sparsest vector  satisfies: . Although the spark provides an upper bound, it is unfeasible to compute in practical scenarios. Based on this metric, it can be proven that the true sparse representation  can be recovered if and only if .

Similarly, under the presence of noise, an upper bound for the distance between the true sparse representation  and its estimation  can be established via the restricted isometry property (RIP). A k-RIP matrix  with constant  corresponds to: , where  is the smallest number that satisfies the inequality for every . Then, assuming , it is guaranteed that .

Solving such a general pursuit problem is a hard task if no structure is imposed on dictionary . This implies learning large, highly overcomplete representations, which is extremely expensive. Assuming such a burden has been met and a representative dictionary has been obtained for a given signal , typically based on prior information,  can be estimated via several pursuit algorithms.

Pursuit algorithms for the global sparse model 
Two basic methods for solving the global sparse coding problem are orthogonal matching pursuit (OMP) and basis pursuit (BP). On the other hand, basis pursuit is a more sophisticated approach that replaces the original coding problem by a linear programming problem. The reader is referred to (section 2) for details regarding this properties.

Convolutional sparse coding model 
Let  be constructed from shifted versions of a local dictionary .

From the latter,  can be re-expressed by  disjoint sparse vectors : . Similarly, let  be a set of  consecutive vectors . Thus,  contains only  nonzero columns. Given the new dictionary structure, let the  pseudo-norm be defined as: . Then, for the noise-free and noise-corrupted scenarios, the problem can be respectively reformulated as:

Stability and uniqueness guarantees for the convolutional sparse model 
For the local approach,  mutual coherence satisfies:  So, if a solution obeys , then it is the sparsest solution to the  problem. Thus, under the local formulation, the same number of non-zeros is permitted for each stripe instead of the full vector!

Similar to the global model, the CSC is solved via OMP and BP methods, the latter contemplating the use of the iterative shrinkage thresholding algorithm (ISTA)  for splitting the pursuit into smaller problems. Based on the  pseudonorm, if a solution  exists satisfying , then both methods are guaranteed to recover it. Moreover, the local model guarantees recovery independently of the signal dimension, as opposed to the  prior. Stability conditions for OMP and BP are also guaranteed if its exact recovery condition (ERC) is met for a support  with a constant . The ERC is defined as: , where  denotes the Pseudo-inverse. Algorithm 1 shows the Global Pursuit method based on ISTA.

Algorithm 1: 1D CSC via local iterative soft-thresholding.

Input:

: Local Dictionary,

: observation,

: Regularization parameter,

: step size for ISTA,

tol: tolerance factor,

maxiters: maximum number of iterations.

 (Initialize disjoint patches.)

 (Initialize residual patches.)

Repeat

 (Coding along disjoint patches)

  (Patch Aggregation)

 (Update residuals)

Until  tol or  maxiters.

Multi-layered convolutional sparse coding model 

Similarly, such a constraint can be applied to its representation itself, generating a cascade of sparse representations: Each code is defined by a few atoms of a given set of convolutional dictionaries.

Based on this criteria, yet another extension denominated mlti-layer convolutional sparse coding (ML-CSC) is proposed. A set of analytical dictionaries  can be efficiently designed, where sparse representations at each layer  are guaranteed by imposing the sparsity prior over the dictionaries themselves. In other words, by considering dictionaries to be stride convolutional matrices i.e. atoms of the local dictionaries shift  elements instead of a single one, where  corresponds to the number of channels in the previous layer, it is guaranteed that the  norm of the representations along layers is bounded.

Then, the estimation of each representation is formulated as an optimization problem for both noise-free and noise-corrupted scenarios, respectively. Assuming : 

In what follows, theoretical guarantees for the uniqueness and stability of this extended model are described.

Theorem 1: (Uniqueness of sparse representations) Consider signal  satisfies the (ML-CSC) model for a set of convolutional dictionaries  with mutual coherence . If the true sparse representations satisfy , then a solution to the problem  will be its unique solution if the thresholds are chosen to satisfy: .

Projection-based algorithms 

Such a projection is described as: 

which have closed-form solutions via the hard-thresholding  and soft-thresholding algorithms , respectively. If a nonnegative constraint is also contemplated, the problem can be expressed via the  norm as:  which closed-form solution corresponds to the soft nonnegative thresholding operator , where . Guarantees for the Layered soft-thresholding approach are included in the Appendix (Section 6.2).

Connections to convolutional neural networks 

Recall the forward pass of the convolutional neural network model, used in both training and inference steps. Let  be its input and  the filters at layer , which are followed by the rectified linear unit (RLU) , for bias . Based on this elementary block, taking  as example, the CNN output can be expressed as:  Finally, comparing the CNN algorithm and the Layered thresholding approach for the nonnegative , it is straightforward to show that both are equivalent: 

As explained in what follows, this naive approach of solving the coding problem is a particular case of a more stable projected gradient descent algorithm for the ML-CSC model. Equipped with the stability conditions of both approaches, a more clear understanding about the class of signals a CNN can recover, under what noise conditions can an estimation be accurately attained, and how can its structure be modified to improve its theoretical conditions. The reader is referred to (section 5) for details regarding their connection.

Pursuit algorithms for the multi-layer  CSC model 

A crucial limitation of the forward pass is it being unable to recover the unique solution of the DCP problem, which existence has been demonstrated. So, instead of using a thresholding approach at each layer, a full pursuit method is adopted, denominated layered basis pursuit (LBP). Among the methods for solving the layered coding problem, ISTA is an efficient decoupling alternative. In what follows, a short summary of the guarantees for the LBP are established.

Theorem 4: (Recovery guarantee) Consider a signal  characterized by a set of sparse vectors , convolutional dictionaries  and their corresponding mutual coherences . If , then the LBP algorithm is guaranteed to recover the sparse representations.

Let  be solutions obtained via the LBP algorithm with parameters .

Applications of the convolutional sparse coding model: image inpainting 

As a practical example, an efficient image inpainting method for color images via the CSC model is shown. Given an observation , where randomly chosen channels at unknown pixel locations are fixed to zero, in a similar way to impulse noise, the problem is formulated as:  By means of ADMM, the cost function is decoupled into simpler sub-problems, allowing an efficient  estimation. The reader is referred to (Section II) for details on the ADMM implementation and the dictionary learning procedure.

Algorithm 2: Color image inpainting via the convolutional sparse coding model.

Input:

: DFT of convolutional matrices ,

: Color observation,

: Regularization parameter,

: step sizes for ADMM,

tol: tolerance factor,

maxiters: maximum number of iterations.

Repeat

Until tol or  maxiters.

References

External links 
 SParse Optimization Research COde (SPORCO)

Coding theory